The Mok-dong Line is a future subway line scheduled to open in 2028, in Seoul, South Korea. Construction is scheduled to begin in 2021.

Stations
The names of the stations are not yet final.

References 

Seoul Metropolitan Subway lines